Pichler is a German surname. Notable people with the surname include:

 Alfred Pichler (1913–1992), bishop
 Anita Pichler (1948–1997), Italian writer and translator
 Anton Pichler (footballer) (born 1955)
 Anton Pichler (1697–1779), engraver
 Benedikt Pichler, Austrian footballer
 Berta Pichler, luger
 Bernd Pichler, biomedical engineer
 Christian Pichler (born 1988), skater
 David Pichler (born 1968), diver
 Gabriela Pichler (born 1980), film director
 Giorgio Pichler, luger
 Giovanni Pichler (1734–1791), engraver
 Günter Pichler (born 1940), violinist
 Hannes Pichler, Italian luger
 Hans Pichler (1882–1958), philosopher
 Harald Pichler (born 1987), footballer
 Helga Pichler, Italian luger
 Imre Pichler (1947–2014), teacher and politician
 Joe Pichler (1987–2006?), actor
 Johann Pichler (1912–1995), German military pilot
 Johannes W. Pichler (born 1947), professor of law
 Joseph Pichler (painter) (1730-1808), fresco painter
 Karoline Pichler (1769–1843), novelist
 Luigi Pichler (1773–1854), engraver
 Ralph Pichler (born 1954), bobsledder
 Rudolf Pichler (1930–2011), footballer
 Sascha Pichler (born 1986), Austrian footballer
 Shakir Pichler (born 1967), musician
 Stefan Pichler (born 1957), CEO
 Vitus Pichler (1670–1736), cleric
 Walter Pichler (biathlete) (born 1959), German biathlete
 Wolfgang Pichler (born 1955), German biathlete

See also 
 Pichl (disambiguation)
 Pickler (disambiguation)

Surnames of South Tyrolean origin
German-language surnames